Providence School of Jacksonville is a private, college preparatory Christian school in Jacksonville, Florida, U.S. It has a preschool, a lower school, a middle school, and a high school, and enrolls about 1,200 students a year. The school is affiliated with the New Life Christian Fellowship, a non-denominational church in Jacksonville, and opened in 1997.

History
Providence School was founded by New Life Christian Fellowship, a non-denominational Christian church in Jacksonville's Southside. The church moved to establish the school when a word of the Lord was given to their. "You are to start a school, that will be high in academics, strong in Biblical teaching, and teach social graces. You are to have excellence in all areas and it is to be up and running in two years."  Shortly after, the school broke ground. Providence opened for class in the fall of 1997 (less than two years later), and saw its enrollment numbers fill quickly, leading to further plans to accommodate growth.

Mission statement
Providence School prepares its students to be boldly Christian and unquestionably academic servant leaders who change the world.

Athletics
Providence is well known for its talent in athletics and has a wide variety of sports for students at all levels.

Some for men include:
Baseball State A State Champs 2003, 2A Champs 2008, & 3A Champs 2012
Basketball State 2A Champs 2010, 2012, 2015
Cross Country
Football
Golf State Contenders 1A
Soccer State Contenders 2A 2008 State Runners-up
Swimming State Contenders 1A
Tennis State Contenders 2A
Wrestling (No longer sponsored) State Contenders 1A

For women, the sports include:
Volleyball District Champions 2005-2014 Regional Champions 2014
Basketball
Cross Country State Contenders 1A
Cheerleading State Champions 2013 (Varsity and MS teams)
Golf
Softball 2008 State Runners-up, District Champs
Soccer District Champions 2017, 2018, 2019.  Class 3A Regional Champions 2022
Swimming State Contenders 1A
Tennis State Contenders 2A
Track and Field State Contenders 1A

Notable alumni
Patric Young, professional basketball player, ESPN SEC Network Studio Host 
Caitlin Brunell,  Miss Alabama 2014
Grayson Allen, Milwaukee Bucks basketball
Tyler Callihan, professional baseball player 
 Nathan Hickey, professional baseball player

References

Christian schools in Florida
Education in Jacksonville, Florida
Educational institutions established in 1997
Private elementary schools in Florida
High schools in Jacksonville, Florida
Private middle schools in Florida
Private high schools in Florida
1997 establishments in Florida